H. A. S. Samaraweera was the 39th Auditor General of Sri Lanka. He was appointed in 2010, succeeding S. Swarnajothi. He was succeeded by Gamini Wijesinghe

References

Auditors General of Sri Lanka